Netvořice is a market town in Benešov District in the Central Bohemian Region of the Czech Republic. It has about 1,200 inhabitants.

Administrative parts
Villages and hamlets of Dunávice, Lhota, Maskovice, Radějovice, Tuchyně and Všetice are administrative parts of Netvořice.

Geography
It lies in the Benešov Uplands. The Brejlovský Brook flows through the market town.

History
The first written mention of Netvořice is in a deed of King Ottokar I of Bohemia from 1205. From 1683 to 1918, Netvořice was owned by the Metropolitan Chapter at Saint Vitus as part of the Lešany estate.

Sights
The landmark of Netvořice is the Church of the Assumption of the Virgin Mary. The original church was built in the 14th or 15th century. It was replaced by the current Baroque building in 1747–1753.

References

External links

Populated places in Benešov District
Market towns in the Czech Republic